Rusul Rosa Kafaji (born 5 July 2003) is a Swedish football striker who plays for BK Häcken in the Swedish Damallsvenskan.

Early life
Kafaji was born to parents who are originally from Iraq and her father moved back there after her parents' divorce.

Club career
Kafaji grew up in Akalla and started playing football in Kallhälls FF when she was eight years old. After that, Kafaji played for Bele Barkarby FF before she went to AIK before the 2015 season. Kafaji made her debut for the A-team in the Elitettan in 2019 and scored four goals and three assists in seven matches during the season. In the 2020 season, she scored 12 goals in 18 matches and helped AIK to be promoted to the Damallsvenskan.

International career
In February 2021, Kafaji was selected for the Swedish women's national team for the first time.

Honours

Club 
AIK
Winners
 Elitettan: 2020

References

External links 
 

2003 births
Living people
People from Solna Municipality
Swedish people of Iraqi descent
Swedish women's footballers
AIK Fotboll (women) players
Damallsvenskan players
Women's association football forwards
Elitettan players
Sportspeople from Stockholm County
21st-century Swedish women